Diaphorothrips is a genus of thrips in the family Phlaeothripidae.

Species
 Diaphorothrips clavipes
 Diaphorothrips hamipes
 Diaphorothrips kraussi
 Diaphorothrips pugnator
 Diaphorothrips unguipes

References

Phlaeothripidae
Thrips
Thrips genera